This is a list of Argentina national football team managers

List 
 Sources:

Notes

References

Lists of national association football team managers